Choma (Burn) is an album by American saxophonist Harold Land recorded in 1971 for the Mainstream label.

Reception

AllMusic awarded the album 3 stars calling it a "Solid early '70s date".

Track listing
All compositions by Harold Land except as indicated
 " Choma (Burn)" - 9:56   
 "Our Home" (Bill Henderson) - 5:52   
 "Black Caucus" - 10:03    
 "Up and Down" - 10:49

Personnel 
Harold Land - tenor saxophone, flute
Bobby Hutcherson - vibraphone, marimba
Bill Henderson - piano, electric piano
Harold Land, Jr. - piano
Reggie Johnson - bass
Ndugu Chancler, Woodrow 'Sonship' Theus - drums

References 

 

1971 albums
Harold Land albums
Mainstream Records albums
Albums produced by Bob Shad